State Route 382 (SR 382) is a  state highway in Roane County in the eastern portion of the U.S. state of Tennessee. It serves as a connector for US 27/SR 61 and US 70 to Roane State Community College's main campus.

Route description

SR 382 begins at an intersection with US 70/SR 1/SR 29 west of downtown Rockwood and travels to the north through the main campus of Roane State Community College and ends at US 27/SR 61 in Cardiff.

Major intersections

See also
 
 
 List of state routes in Tennessee

References

External links
 

382
Transportation in Roane County, Tennessee